Agyneta decora is a species of sheet weaver found in the Holarctic. It was described by O.P.-Cambridge in 1871.

References

decora
Spiders of Europe
Holarctic spiders
Spiders described in 1871